Tony Renis (born 13 May 1938), stage name of Elio Cesari, is an Italian singer, composer, music producer and film actor.

Life and career 
Renis was born in Milan. In the mid-1950s he met with Adriano Celentano, and the two started performing an impression of Dean Martin and Jerry Lewis. In 1958, he was signed by the label "Combo Records", and released a few cover versions of Italian and American rock 'n' roll songs as lead vocalist of the band Combos. In 1961, Renis debuted at the Sanremo Music Festival with the song "Pozzanghere".

In 1962, Renis returned to the Sanremo Music Festival where he gained international recognition with the song "Quando, quando, quando", written with Alberto Testa. One year later, he won the Festival with the song "Uno per tutte", and, in 1967, he finished second with the song "Quando dico che ti amo".

In 1972, Renis and Testa composed the song "Grande grande grande". It was successfully interpreted by Mina, and later by Shirley Bassey as "Never Never Never". Over the years "Grande grande grande" have been covered by Vikki Carr, Celine Dion with Luciano Pavarotti, Julio Iglesias, Patrizio Buanne with Renee Olstead, among others.

In 1974, he won the Nastro d'Argento for the Best Score for his work on the soundtrack of the film Brothers Blue.

In the 1980s, Tony Renis temporarily retired from performing and mainly worked as music producer. In 1981 he launched the career of child prodigy Nikka Costa.

In 1999, Renis received a Golden Globe Award and was nominated for an Oscar for the song "The Prayer", performed by Celine Dion and Andrea Bocelli, from the Quest for Camelot film soundtrack.

In 2005, he won a David di Donatello for the song "Merry Christmas in Love" from the film Christmas in Love. The song was also nominated for Best Original Song at the 63rd Golden Globe Awards.

In 2016 Renis received the America Award of the Italy-USA Foundation.

Discography

Albums (Italy) 
1969: Tony Renis (RCA Italiana, PSL 10435)
1974: Graffiti (EMI Italiana, 3C 048-51500
1976: Tony Renis (RCA Italiana, TCL 1–1078)
1976: Un grande grande grande Tony Renis (RCA Lineatre, NL 31078)
1989: Le più belle di Tony Renis (EMI Italiana, 7931031)

Singles (Italy) 
1958: Come prima/Ti dirò (Combo Record, 5057; with Combos)
1958: Prendi quella stella/Tipitipitipso (5058; with Combos)
1958: Magic Moments/Oggi o mai più (5091; with Combos)
1958: Clopin clopant/Tutto è diverso (5092; with Combos)
1958: Prendi quella stella/Ti dirò (5093; with Combos)
1959: Nessuno al mondo/Addio Maria (La voce del padrone, 7MQ 1224)
1959: Morir d'amor/Ti prego, amore (La voce del padrone, 7MQ 1229)
1960: Tenerezza/Cuore in blue jeans (La voce del padrone, 7MQ 1379)
1961: Pozzanghere/Lei (La voce del padrone, 7MQ 1525)
1961: Piccolo indiano/15 anni (La voce del padrone, 7MQ 1657)
1962: Quando quando quando/Blu (La voce del padrone, 7MQ 1689)
1962: Tango per favore/Amor amor amor (La voce del padrone, 7MQ 1708)
1963: Perché perché/Gli innamorati sono angeli (La voce del padrone, 7MQ 1776)
1963: Uno per tutte/Le ciliegie (La voce del padrone, 7MQ 1777)
1964: Bikini e tamurè/Un ragazzino (La voce del padrone, 7MQ 1819)
1964: Le ciliegie/Gli innamorati sono angeli (La voce del padrone, 7MQ 1823)
1964: Ti guardero nel cuore/Otto e mezzo (La voce del padrone, 7MQ 1846)
1964: Sorrisi di sera/Ti chiedo scusa (La voce del padrone, MQ 1867)
1964: Non sei mariu' stasera/Baciamoci signorina (La voce del padrone, MQ 1882)
1964: Amo Milano/Nostalgia di Milano (Oh mamma mia) (La voce del padrone, MQ 1893)
1965: Il garofano rosso/Nessun'altra che te (RCA Italiana, PM 3318)
1967: Quando dico che ti amo/Mi perderai (RCA Italiana, PM 3389)
1967: Non mi dire mai good bye/Prima di domani (RCA Italiana, PM 3403)
1968: Il posto mio/Che notte sei (RCA Italiana, PM 3439)
1968: Frin frin frin/Cosa non-farei (RCA Italiana, PM 3456)
1969: L'aereo parte/Un ragazzo che ti ama (ZN 50015)
1970: Canzone blu/Dove sei stata Susy (ZN 50019)
1970: Venere/Amami per favore (ZN 50034)
1972: Un uomo tra la folla/Grande grande grande (ZN 50145)

EPs (Italy) 
1959: Ti prego, amore/Elena sono solo/Io cerco te/Romanzo d'amore (La voce del padrone, 7E MQ 124)
1962: Quando quando quando/Tango per favore/Blu/Amor amor amor (La voce del padrone, 7E MQ 239)
1963: Uno per tutte/Le ciliegie/Perché perché/Gli innamorati sono angeli (La voce del padrone, 7E MQ 254)

Albums (International market) 
1964: Tony Renis (EMI, CLP 1754; published in Great Britain)
1969: Chin-chin quechiquitin (RCA Victor, MIL/S 4051; published in Mexico)

Singles (International Market) 
1963: Uno per tutte/Perché perché (His Master's Voice, 63072; published in Spain)
1967: Quando dico che ti amo/Mi perderai (RCA Victor,MA 4073; published in Lebanon)
1967: Quando dico che ti amo/Mi perderai (RCA Victor, 3-10202; published in Spain)
1970: Cancion azul/Las noches de oro (RCA Victor, 3-10504; published in Spain)
1971: Venise va mourir/Anonimo veneziano (CBS, 7606; published in France)
1972: Grande grande grande/Un hombre entre la gente (Hispavox, HS 843; published in Spain)

EPs (International Market) 
1962: Quando quando quando/Blu/Anch'io/Amor amor amor (A voz do dono, 7LEG 6019; published in Portugal)
1963: Uno per tutte/Perche perche/Quando, quando, quando/Dancing (Tango per favore) (His Master's Voice, 7EG 8799; published in Great Britain)
1963: Uno per tutte/Le ciliegie/Perché perché/Gli innamorati sono angeli (His Master's Voice, 7 EGS 271;published in Sweden)
1963: Uno per tutte/Perché perché/Tango per favore/La tua mano (Cheque Disque, EMF 336; published in France)
1964: Otto e mezzo/Un muchachito/Sorrisi di sera/Ti guarderò nel cuore (A voz do dono, 7LEM 3130; published in Portugal)

Sports work 
He composed the AC Milan Anthem - Milan Milan in 1988

Filmography 

 Io bacio... tu baci, directed by Piero Vivarelli (1961)
 Appuntamento in riviera, directed by Mario Mattoli (1962)
 Obiettivo ragazze, directed by Mario Mattoli (1963)
 Ischia operazione amore, directed by Vittorio Sala (1966)
 Quando dico che ti amo, directed by Giorgio Bianchi (1967)
 La ragazza del bersagliere, directed by Alessandro Blasetti (1967)
 Non mi dire mai goodbye, directed by Frank G. Carrol (1967)
 Per amore... per magia..., directed by Duccio Tessari (1967)
 Totò Ye Ye, directed by Daniele D'Anza (1967, Television film)
 The Black Corsair, directed by Sergio Sollima (1976)

References

External links 
 

1938 births
Italian composers
Italian male composers
Living people
Singers from Milan
Italian record producers
Golden Globe Award-winning musicians
Nastro d'Argento winners
Italian male film actors
Sanremo Music Festival winners
Spanish-language singers of Italy